The threat of radiological attacks has led several organizations to develop specially designed nuclear detection systems.  These systems differ in design and abilities.
 Neutron Scatter Camera  (Sandia National Labs)
 MINDS - Miniature Integrated Nuclear Detection System (Princeton Plasma Physics Lab)
 Center for Neutron Research (NIST)

See also
 Neutron Scatter Camera Detects Shielded Radiation To Find Smuggled Nuclear Material, Science Daily, November 26, 2007
 Nuclear MASINT

Nuclear materials
Nuclear safety and security